Xanthorhoe macdunnoughi is a species of moth in the family Geometridae (geometrid moths). It was first described by Louis W. Swett in 1918 and is found in North America, where it has been recorded from open wooded areas in western North America, ranging east to western Alberta and south to California.

The wingspan is about 28 mm. Adults are mottled grey, with a darker grey median band on the forewings.

The MONA or Hodges number for Xanthorhoe macdunnoughi is 7372.

References

Further reading
 Arnett, Ross H. (2000). American Insects: A Handbook of the Insects of America North of Mexico. CRC Press.
 Scoble, Malcolm J., ed. (1999). Geometrid Moths of the World: A Catalogue (Lepidoptera, Geometridae). 1016.

External links
Butterflies and Moths of North America
NCBI Taxonomy Browser, Xanthorhoe macdunnoughi

Geometridae
Moths described in 1918